2016 PQ is an approximately 20-meter sized asteroid and near-Earth object of the Apollo group, with one of the smallest known minimum orbital intersection distances with Earth.

Discovery 

The asteroid was discovered by the Pan-STARRS telescope on 2 August 2016, when it had reached magnitude 20.5, and it had brightened by magnitude 19.0 three nights later, after which it became too close to the Sun to spot with ground-based telescopes. It reached its closest approach to the Earth on 7 August 2016, at 0.025 AU, or 9.8 lunar distances.

Orbit 

 orbits the Sun at a distance of 0.9–2.9 AU once every 2 years and 8 months (961 days). Its orbit has an eccentricity of 0.54 and an inclination of 3° with respect to the ecliptic.

MOID 

Despite its very low MOID, it is not on the Sentry Risk Table, as it is not going to make any nearby close approaches to Earth in the near future. It is too small to be classified as a potentially hazardous asteroid.

See also
List of asteroid close approaches to Earth in 2016
2016 EU85

References

External links 
 
 
 

Minor planet object articles (unnumbered)
20160807
20160802